A Dutch cap or Dutch bonnet is a style of woman's hat associated with the various traditional Dutch woman's costumes.  Usually made of white cotton or lace, it is sometimes characterized by triangular flaps or wings that turn up on either side.  It can resemble some styles of nurse's hat.

Many parts of the Netherlands have their own traditional costumes.

Images

References

Caps
Bonnets (headgear)
Dutch inventions